Ratko Tankosić (born 5 June 1954) is a Serbian actor. He appeared in more than one hundred films since 1972.

Selected filmography

References

External links 

1954 births
Living people
Male actors from Belgrade
Serbian male film actors
20th-century Serbian male actors